Pierre Auguste Antoine Marie Guichet, MSC, MBE (born 21 January 1915, died 6 October 1989) was the Catholic bishop of the Diocese of Tarawa from 1961 to 1978, when Paul Mea succeeded him.

He was titular bishop of Stectorium from 1961 to 1966 as Vicar Apostolic of the Gilbert and Ellice Islands, until it was elevated as the Diocese of Tarawa in Teaoraereke in 1966.

He was ordained a priest on 24 March 1946, was the superior of the Mission of Melanesia, and consecrated bishop on 18 November 1961.

See also
1975 New Year Honours

References

External links
Diocese of Tarawa and Nauru
TROIS NOUVEAUX ARCHEVÊCHÉS ET SEPT NOUVEAUX ÉVÊCHÉS EN OCÉANIE.

1989 deaths
20th-century French Roman Catholic bishops
1915 births
French Roman Catholic bishops in Oceania
French expatriates in Kiribati
Roman Catholic bishops of Tarawa and Nauru
Missionaries of the Sacred Heart